Events from the year 2019 in Luxembourg.

Incumbents
Monarch: Henri
Prime Minister: Xavier Bettel

Events 

 9 August — A multiple-vortex, high-end F2 tornado tore directly through Rodange, Lamadelaine and Pétange, injuring 19 people and causing damage to many buildings, leaving as many as 100 buildings uninhabitable.

Deaths

February
 11 February – Alix, Princess of Ligne, Princess of Luxembourg (b. 1929)
 21 February
 Bernard Berg, Luxembourgian politician (b. 1931)
 Triny Bourkel, Luxembourgian Olympic athlete (b. 1927)

March
 23 March – Ferd Lahure, Luxembourgian footballer (b. 1929)

April
 23 April – Jean, Grand Duke of Luxembourg (b. 1921)

July
 3 July – Pol Cruchten, Luxembourgish film director (b. 1963)

References

 
Luxembourg